Aleksey Illarionovich Kirichenko ( – 28 December 1975) was a Soviet Ukrainian politician, who was the first ethnic Ukrainian to head the republic's communist party during the Soviet era. Between 1957 and 1960, he was a Secretary of the Central Committee of the Communist Party of the Soviet Union and the second-highest-ranking official within the party after Nikita Khrushchev.

Early life and career
Aleksey Illarionovich Kirichenko was born in the village of Chornobaivka in the Kherson region of south-eastern Ukraine, which was then part of the Russian Empire, into a family of Ukrainian factory workers. From the age of 11, he started earning for living by working in the fields and then at railways. After graduating from a mechanical school he worked in Kazakhstan as an engineer in a sovkhoz (state farm). He then returned to Ukraine to receive a university degree and teach agricultural engineering, and graduated in 1936.

Political career

Under Stalin 
In 1938, he became a member of the Central Committee of the Communist Party of Ukraine (CPU), soon after Nikita Khrushchev had been appointed as First Secretary. In 1941, he was appointed Secretary of the CPU during World War II, and served as a member of the military council.

Kirichenko was First Secretary of the Odessa Oblast party committee from 1945 to 1949, coinciding with the Soviet famine of 1946–1947. Ukraine in particular suffered from the effects of the famine, in part due to the devastating effects of World War II on Ukrainian territory. During this period, Kirichenko told Khrushchev that, while visiting the home of kolkhoz (collective farm) workers:

Kirichenko was a member of the Central Committee of the Communist Party of the Soviet Union from 1952 to 1961, and Second Secretary of the Central Committee of the CPU from 1949 to 1953.

Under Khrushchev 
According to Khrushchev, Kirichenko's promotion to First Secretary the CPU in June 1953 was originally proposed by chief of the NKVD Lavrentiy Beria shortly before his downfall. However, Kirichenko was one of Khrushchev's most influential allies. In July 1955, he was promoted to the 11-member Politburo. In June 1957, he rushed to Moscow at short notice to take part in a Politburo meeting at which Khrushchev's rivals, led by Georgy Malenkov were seeking to remove him from office. He helped Khrushchev turn the tables and oust Malenkov and others.

In December 1957, Kirichenko was transferred to Moscow as the Central Committee Secretary in charge of party appointments. This meant that he was officially ranked as one of the five most senior figures in the party, but because of his office and relative youth, he was the person most obviously placed to succeed Khrushchev. Khrushchev mentioned this to the U.S. Ambassador W. Averell Harriman, in June 1959, but added, "I am very jealous of my prerogatives, and while I live, I will run the party." He flew into a rage, banged the desk with his fist and shouted down the phone when Kirichenko tried to transfer a senior official from Moscow to Leningrad without consulting him.

Downfall, later life, and death 
On 13 January 1960, it was suddenly announced that Kirichenko had been appointed First Secretary of the Rostov Oblast party committee. In May, he was formally dismissed from the Politburo and the party secretariat, and on 15 June 1960, he was sacked from his post in Rostov, after just five months.

He retired in 1962, died in 1975 and was buried at the Novodevichy Cemetery in Moscow.

According to Enver Hoxha, in the midst of the Soviet-Albanian split an Albanian military student studying in the Soviet Union had met Kirichenko during a train ride. The latter said to him, "Good for your Party, which exposed Khrushchev. Long live Enver Hoxha! Long live socialist Albania! ... Don't yield, give Enver my best wishes!"

Notes

References

1908 births
1975 deaths
People from Chornobaivka
People from Khersonsky Uyezd
Ukrainian people in the Russian Empire
Politburo of the Central Committee of the Communist Party of the Soviet Union members
First Secretaries of the Communist Party of Ukraine (Soviet Union)
Second convocation members of the Supreme Soviet of the Soviet Union
Third convocation members of the Supreme Soviet of the Soviet Union
Fourth convocation members of the Supreme Soviet of the Soviet Union
Fifth convocation members of the Supreme Soviet of the Soviet Union
Members of the Supreme Soviet of the Russian Soviet Federative Socialist Republic
Komsomol of Ukraine members
Soviet major generals
Soviet military personnel of World War II from Ukraine
Recipients of the Order of Lenin
Recipients of the Order of the Red Banner
Recipients of the Order of Kutuzov, 2nd class
Burials at Novodevichy Cemetery